Yachting New Zealand is recognised by the International Sailing Federation as the governing body for the sport of sailing in New Zealand. Yachting New Zealand also facilitates training in sailing in and around the country.

History
The emigration of Robert Logan (Senior) with the skills he had learnt boatbuilding on the Clyde encouraged the adoption of frameless diagonally planked two and three-skinned yachts in New Zealand. When combined with the use of the locally grown kauri Agathis australis the resulting hulls were extraordinarily long-lived, being highly resistant to rot and damage.

Logan's firm and his son's Archibald Logan, Robert Logan (Junior) and John Logan's own separate boatbuilding firm of Logan Brothers together with the Bailey boatbuilding family were to dominant yacht building in New Zealand from 1880 to the 1930s.

Clubs
See :Category:Yacht clubs in New Zealand

Notable sailors
See :Category:New Zealand sailors

Olympic sailing
See :Category:Olympic sailors of New Zealand

High-profile sailor include Olympian and Americas Cup legend Russell Coutts.

Offshore sailing
See :Category:New Zealand sailors (sport)

New Zealand teams have a history in the Americas Cup and it was the strong showing of the 12 metre KZ7 nicknamed the "plastic fantastic" with a young team led by Chris Dickson that brought global recognition. Team New Zealand continued the tradition, both challenging for and winning the Americas Cup.

Peter Blake and Grant Dalton both became famous through success in the Whitbread Round the World Race.

Marine industry
The marine industry is strong; high-profile builders include Boat Speed International.

References

Bibliography

External links
Official Website
ISAF MNA Microsite

National members of World Sailing
Yachting associations
Sailing associations
Sailing in New Zealand
Sports governing bodies in New Zealand
1954 establishments in New Zealand
Sports organizations established in 1954